Posy may refer to:

 Blue posy, a species of butterfly of the family Lycaenidae
 Common posy, a butterfly in the family Lycaenidae
 Brassica 'Petit Posy', a cross between brussels sprouts and kale
 Lincolnshire Posy, a musical piece by Percy Grainger for concert band
 Posy ring, a gold finger ring with a short inscription

First name
 Posy Fossil, a character in the book Ballet Shoes
 Posy Miller, British actor
 Posy Simmonds, British cartoonist, writer, and illustrator

Surname
 Carl Posy, Israeli philosopher

See also
 Posies (disambiguation)